Petri Penttinen (born 24 September 1965) is a Finnish freestyle skier. He competed in the men's moguls event at the 1992 Winter Olympics.

References

1965 births
Living people
Finnish male freestyle skiers
Olympic freestyle skiers of Finland
Freestyle skiers at the 1992 Winter Olympics
Sportspeople from Helsinki